The Six Hour Le Mans was an endurance motor race for sports cars and touring cars held annually in Western Australia from 1955 to 1972. Initially run at the Caversham Airfield circuit, the event was moved, along with all other WA circuit racing, to the then new Wanneroo Raceway in 1969.

Winners

Further reading
Around The Houses (© 1980) by Terry Walker
A History of Australian Motor Sport (© 1980) by Jim Shepherd